Sitamarhi is an Indian city and the district headquarters of the Sitamarhi district in the Mithila region of Bihar and is a part of the Tirhut Division.The name of the city had kept as honours the birthplace of the goddess, Sita.The Bihar government declared Sitamarhi a municipal council.

In 1875, a subdivision for Sitamarhi was created within the Muzaffarpur district. Sitamarhi was detached from the Muzaffarpur district and made a separate district on 11 December 1972. It is situated in the northern part of Bihar.

Geography

There are multiple small towns that are famous in Sitamarhi, like Bairgania, Sursand and Bhitthamore which are located at Indo-Nepal border. Other famous places in Sitamarhi region are Bathnaha, Sonbarsa, Bajpatti, Pupri, Parihar, Runnisaidpur, Belsand (Vidhansabha constituency), Parsauni, and Dumra is near Sitamarhi which is known for all the government offices.

Culture
Sitamarhi dates back to the time of Ramayana and is considered as the place where King Janaka found Sita. 

A temple dedicated to the goddess Sita, a subject of the epic Ramayana, is located at Punaura Dham Sitamarhi. A rock-cut sanctuary from the great Mauryan period is found near Sitamarhi.

Rama Navami is a spring festival in Dumra, widely celebrated with a large fair held to mark the occasion. Also in Janki Mandir popularly known as Janaki Sthan (temple with history from 1599) next to Urjiva Kund (where Sita was found in the heart of the earth) a marriage ceremony of Ram and Sita happens every year. Sama Chakeva is a prominent winter festival dedicated to celebrate brother-sister relationships. This is a major cultural event with marriage ceremonies and many cultural rituals that take much preparation.

Demographics
Sitamarhi District has a total population of around 1,06,093. There are around 56,693 males and 49,400 females. The numbers of literate males are 39,537, and that of literate females are 29,970. In total 69,507 people are literate. The average literacy rate is 52.04% in total, 60.64% for males, and 42.41% for females. The sex ratio is 899. The child sex ratio is 872.

Administration
Sitamarhi is a part of Tirhut Division. Presently, Sitamarhi consists of three sub-divisions and seventeen blocks. Its headquarter is located at Dumra, five kilometers south of Sitamarhi. The district magistrate is the top-most official of revenue and civil administration and assisted by ADM and other officers, posted in the district.  The district has been divided into three subdivisions, namely Sadar, Pupri, and Belsand which are headed by sub-divisional officers either from I.A.S.(Indian Administration service) or B.A.S.( Bihar Administration Service) cadre. S.D.Os.(Sub-divisional officer) are under the direct authority of D.M.(District Magistrate) Subdivisions are divided into 17 development blocks where B.D.Os.( Block Development Officer) are posted who undertake development and welfare projects. Sitamarhi district has 845 revenue villages. The superintendent of police, Sitamarhi, is the head of the district police administration and is assisted by the deputy superintendent of police. In each subdivision of the district, the deputy superintendent of police are posted who keep control on police administration. The judges and Munshif magistrates are posted at district and sub-division who administer and deliver justice of different kinds.

Tourism
 Sita Kund
 Haleshwar Sthan

Transportation
National Highway 77 connects the area to the Mehsi, Muzaffarpur district and Patna. National Highways 77 and other roads connect to the adjoining districts. National Highway 104 (India) connects it to Sursand, Bhitthamore border, Charaut and Jaynagar and Sheohar . State highways link it to Madhubani district in the East.

Sitamarhi Junction railway station is a five-platform station on the Darbhanga–Raxaul–Narkatiaganj line, which was converted to broad gauge in February 2014. Another broad-gauge track connects Sitamarhi to Muzaffarpur. Direct train services are available from Sitamarhi railway junction to places such as New Delhi, Kolkata, Varanasi, Lucknow, Guwahati (Kamakhya), Hyderabad, Kanpur and Mumbai.

Sitamarhi is connected to cities in and around Bihar by state-owned transport services. Many private buses (both AC and non-AC) operate between Sitamarhi and Patna.

Notable people
Ramesh Thakur – Assistant Secretary-General, United Nations.
Thakur Jugal Kishore Sinha – former member of parliament (MP) and freedom fighter. Father of the co-operative movement
Ram Dulari Sinha – former Union Minister and governor and freedom fighter. First woman from Bihar to become governor
Devesh Chandra Thakur – deputy leader, Bihar Legislative Council
Prabhat Jha – Politician and Journalist
Nawal Kishore Rai – Ex-member of parliament
Sitaram Yadav – ex-member of parliament
Ram Kumar Sharma – Indian politician and a former member of parliament from Sitamarhi, Bihar
Sunil Kumar Pintu – member of parliament from Sitamarh, Bihar
Vikash Jha – journalist and author
Gaurav Sharma – author

References

External links
 Main site
 Portal of Sitamarhi
 Official website of Tirhut Division

Cities and towns in Sitamarhi district
Sitamarhi district
Places in the Ramayana